Leghorn Mission Support Site (also known as Leghorn MSS, Eagle's Nest, Gibralter or Golf-5) was a MACV-SOG base located northwest of Đắk Tô Base Camp, in Attapeu Province, Laos.

History
The base was located on a steep and narrow ridgeline, approximately 10 km west of the Vietnam-Laos border and 43 km northwest of Đắk Tô Base Camp.

The base was first established on 15 January 1967 as an operations base and radio relay site to allow SOG teams to remain in contact while conducting operations in southern Laos. The hillside on which it was constructed was so steep as to render the base practically impervious to ground attack or small arms or mortar fire. While intended as a temporary facility, Leghorn remained in use for five years.

Current use
The base has reverted to jungle.

See also
Hickory Hill Mission Support Site
Sledgehammer Mission Support Site

References

Military installations of the United States in Laos
Military installations closed in the 1970s